The Elephant Man is a play by Bernard Pomerance. It premiered at the Hampstead Theatre in London on 7 November 1977. It later played in repertory at the National Theatre in London. It ran Off-Broadway from 14 January to 18 March 1979, at The Theatre at St. Peter's. The production's Broadway debut in 1979 at the Booth Theatre was produced by Richmond Crinkley and Nelle Nugent, and directed by Jack Hofsiss. The play closed in 1981 after eight previews and 916 regular performances, with revivals in 2002 and 2014.
 
The story is based on the life of Joseph Merrick, referred to in the script as John Merrick, who lived in the Victorian era and is known for the extreme deformity of his body. The lead role of Merrick was originated by David Schofield in a definitive performance. Subsequent productions starred actors including Philip Anglim, David Bowie, Mark Hamill, Bruce Davison, and Bradley Cooper.

The play calls for no prosthetic makeup.

Plot
The Elephant Man opens with Frederick Treves, an up-and-coming surgeon, meeting his new employer Francis Carr-Gomm, the administrator of the London Hospital.

Ross, the manager of a freak show, invites a crowd on Whitechapel Road to come view John Merrick, the Elephant Man.  Treves happens upon the freak show and is intrigued by Merrick's disorder.  He insists that he must study Merrick further; Ross agrees, for a fee. Ross then gives a lecture on Merrick's anatomy, making Merrick stand on display while Treves describes his condition to the audience.

The freak show travels to Brussels after being driven out of London by the police.  Merrick tries to converse with three freak show "pinheads", or people suffering from microcephaly and mental retardation.  The "pinheads" go onstage to sing "We Are the Queens of the Congo", but the police will not allow Merrick to perform, because they consider his condition "indecent".  Ross decides that Merrick is more trouble than he is worth, steals his savings, and sends him back to London.

When Merrick arrives in London, his appearance incites a crowd to riot. The train's conductor and a policeman are able to fetch Treves to calm the situation. Treves takes Merrick to the London Hospital and interviews a woman, Nurse Sandwich, for the position of Merrick's caretaker.  Sandwich assures Treves that she has cared for lepers in Africa and is quite prepared for anything.  However, when she sees Merrick taking a bath, she bolts from the room and refuses to take the job.

Bishop How visits Merrick and declares him a "true Christian in the rough". He tells Treves he would like to educate Merrick in religion. Carr-Gomm argues with Bishop How about the importance of science versus the importance of religion. Carr-Gomm announces that, due to a letter he had printed in The Times, the people of London have donated enough money to allow Merrick to live at the hospital for life. Treves tells Gomm that he is glad Merrick now has a place where he can stay without being stared at, and is determined that Merrick should lead a normal life.

When two attendants, Will and Snork, are caught peeking into Merrick's room, Will is fired and Snork is given a severe warning. Treves believes that it is important to enforce these rules, but Merrick worries what will happen to Will and his family. Merrick grew up in the workhouses, and wishes that no one had to suffer that fate. Treves says that it is just the way things are.

John Merrick has a visitor by the name of Madge Kendal, an actress who came across Carr-Gomm's section in the newspaper. When Mrs. Kendal meets Merrick, she requires all of her self-control in order to disguise her horror at Merrick’s appearance. After several minutes of strained conversation, Merrick mentions he is reading Romeo and Juliet, and Mrs. Kendal shares her experience in the role of Juliet. Merrick amazes Mrs. Kendal with his thoughtful and sensitive views on Romeo and the nature of love. Mrs. Kendal says that she will bring some of her friends to meet Merrick, then shakes his hand and tells him how truly pleased she is to meet him.  Merrick dissolves into tears as Treves tells Mrs. Kendal that it is the first time a woman has ever shaken his hand.

Mrs. Kendal's high society friends visit Merrick and bring him gifts while he builds a model of St. Phillip's church with his one good hand. He tells Mrs. Kendal that St. Phillip’s Church is an imitation of grace, and his model is therefore an imitation of an imitation. When Treves comments that all of humanity is a mere illusion of heaven, Merrick says that God should have used both hands.  Merrick's new friends—Bishop How, Gomm, the Duchess, Princess Alexandra, Treves, and Mrs. Kendal—all comment upon how, in different ways, they see themselves reflected in him.  However, Treves notes that even though Merrick has become popular, his condition is worsening with time.

Merrick tells Mrs. Kendal that he needs a mistress and suggests that he would like her to do that for him.  Mrs. Kendal listens compassionately, but she tells Merrick that it is unlikely that he will ever have a mistress. Merrick admits that he has never even seen a naked woman. Mrs. Kendal is flattered by his show of trust in her, and she realizes that she has come to trust him. She undresses and allows him to see her naked body. Treves enters and is shocked, sending Mrs. Kendal away.

Ross comes to the hospital to ask Merrick to rejoin the freak show.  Ross's health has drastically worsened, and he tells Merrick that without help he is doomed to a painful death.  He tries to convince Merrick to charge the society members who visit him. Merrick refuses to help Ross, finally standing up to him after suffering years of abuse at his hands. Ross makes one final pathetic plea to Merrick, who refuses him, saying that's just the way things are.

Merrick asks Treves what he believes about God and heaven.  Then he confronts Treves, criticizing what he did to Mrs. Kendal and the rigid standards by which he judges everybody.  Treves realizes that he has been too harsh with Merrick and tells him that although he will write to Mrs. Kendal, he does not believe she will return. After Merrick leaves the room, Treves says that it is because he does not want her to see Merrick die.

Treves has a nightmare that he has been put on display while Merrick delivers a lecture about his terrifying normality, his rigidity, and the acts of cruelty he can commit upon others "for their own good".

Carr-Gomm and Treves discuss Merrick's impending death. Treves displays frustration at the fact that the more normal Merrick pretends to be, the worse his condition becomes. He confronts Bishop How, telling him that he believes Merrick’s faith is merely another attempt to emulate others. It comes out that the real source of his frustrations is the chaos of the world around him, with his patients seemingly doing everything they can to shorten their own lives. No matter how hard he tries he cannot help them, just as he cannot help Merrick. He finally begs for the bishop to help him.

Merrick finishes his model of the church. As usual, he goes to sleep while sitting, a posture which he must adopt due to the weight of his head. As he sleeps he sees visions of the pinheads, now singing that they are the Queens of the Cosmos. They lay him down to sleep normally, and he dies. Snork discovers his body and runs out screaming that the Elephant Man is dead.

In the final scene, Carr-Gomm reads a letter he has written to The Times, outlining Merrick’s stay at the hospital, his death and his plans for the remaining funds donated for Merrick's care. When he asks Treves if he has anything else to add, a distressed Treves says he does not and leaves. As Carr-Gomm finishes the letter Treves rushes back in, saying that he’s thought of something. Carr-Gomm tells the doctor that it is too late: it is done.

Broadway production, 1979:
 Philip Anglim as John Merrick
 JoAnne Belanger as Orderly (understudy), Princess Alexandra (understudy), Pinhead (understudy), Countess (understudy), Miss Sandwich (understudy)
 Richard Clarke as Francis Carr-Gomm, Conductor
 Kevin Conway as Frederick Treves, Belgian Policeman
 Dennis Creaghan as Orderly, London Policeman (understudy), Lord John (understudy), Will (understudy), Earl (understudy), Pinhead Manager (understudy)
 Michael Goldschlager as Cellist (standby)
 Cordis Heard as Miss Sandwich, Princess Alexandra, Pinhead, Countess, Mrs. Kendal (understudy)
 David Heiss as Cellist
 I. M. Hobson as Bishop Walsham How, Ross, Snork
 John Neville-Andrews as Pinhead Manager, London Policeman, Lord John, Will, Earl, Frederick Treves (understudy), Belgian Policeman (understudy)
 Carole Shelley as Pinhead, Mrs. Kendal
 Jack Wetherall as John Merrick (standby)

2002 revival 
A revival of the production was staged at the Royale Theatre on Broadway in April 2002, running for 57 performances, and closed on 2 June 2002. It was directed by Sean Mathias and starred Billy Crudup, Rupert Graves and Kate Burton in the leading roles and James Riordan and Jack Gilpin portraying several supporting roles each. The production received Tony Nominations for Crudup and Burton.

201415 revival 
A 2014 revival, starring Bradley Cooper, Patricia Clarkson, and Alessandro Nivola, opened at the Booth Theatre on 7 December for a 13-week engagement (through 15 February 2015). Cooper, who appeared as Merrick in a revival at the 2012 Williamstown Theatre Festival, reprised his role. Scott Ellis, who directed the Williamstown production, also staged the Broadway return. In May 2015, the production, again starring Cooper, Clarkson, and Nivola, opened at the Theatre Royal Haymarket London for a limited 12-week run from 19 May until 8 August.

Adaptations
The play was adapted for television by Steve Lawson and broadcast in 1982 on ABC. Philip Anglim reprised his Broadway performance and Hofsiss returned to direct. Actress Penny Fuller received an Emmy Award for her performance as Mrs. Kendal.

A radio drama adaptation by the BBC World Service was broadcast in 1988. It was directed by David Hitchenson and starred Gerard Murphy as John Merrick the elephant man; Jeremy Clyde as Frederick Treves the doctor; Anna Massey as actress Mrs. Kendal.

Awards and nominations

Original Broadway Production (1979)

Honor
 1979 Selection, The Burns Mantle Theater Yearbook, The Best Plays of 1978-1979

2002 Broadway Revival

2014 Broadway Revival

References

Further reading

External links 

 
 
 
 

Broadway plays
Plays and musicals about disability
Cultural depictions of Joseph Merrick
British plays adapted into films
Plays based on real people
Plays set in England
Plays set in the 19th century
Drama Desk Award-winning plays
Tony Award-winning plays
1977 plays